McNicoll is an anglicized version of the Scottish Gaelic surname, MacNeacail, and may refer to:

Alan McNicoll (1908–1987), Australian navy officer
 Carol McNicoll (born 1943), English pottery artist
 Cedric McNicoll (born 1988), Canadian ice hockey player
 Craig McNicoll (born 1971), English speed skater
 Daniel McNicoll, American film producer and director
 Elle McNicoll, Scottish writer
Helen McNicoll (1879–1915), Canadian impressionist painter
Iain McNicoll, Scottish Royal Air Force officer
 James Nicoll (born 1961), Canadian video game reviewer
 Kinley McNicoll, Canadian soccer player
 Ronald McNicoll (1906–1996), Australian army general
Steven McNicoll (born 1970), Scottish actor
Sylvia McNicoll (born 1954), Canadian author
Walter McNicoll (1877–1947), Australian brigadier general, Administrator of Territory of New Guinea

See also
Mount McNicoll, British Columbia
Port McNicoll, Ontario

Mcnicholl